The Pieterpad is a long distance walking route in the Netherlands. The Pieterpad is one of the official Long Distance Paths in the Netherlands (Lange Afstand Wandelpad Nummer 9) and by far the most popular of its long distance walking routes. It is possible to walk the route in either direction, and throughout the year. It is well signposted, and is well served by public transport and accommodation throughout its length. The official guide book is in two volumes, Pieterburen-Vorden and Vorden-Maastricht. A dedicated website (in Dutch) also gives updated accommodation details. Although the walking is always easy and never remote, it is a varied and often beautiful walk, passing through woods, polders, heathland, and numerous small Dutch villages.

History
The trail was the idea of Toos Goorhuis-Tjalsma (1915-2004) living in Tilburg, in the south of the Netherlands and her friend Bertje Jens (1913-2009) living in Groningen in the north of the Netherlands. They came up with the idea to design a rambling route between their hometowns, later re-organised between the far north to the far south. The route has been officially open since 1983.

Stages
The route of the Pieterpad is described in the following stages:

The Pieterpad connects to the international trails E9 at its northern end in Pieterburen and the GR5 at its southern end and crosses the E11 in Oldenzaal and the E8 in Nijmegen. It  follows the European walking GR5, which is also part of trail E2. The GR5, which runs through the Ardennes to Nice and the French Alps, is one of the most popular international trails for hikers.

Gallery

References

Hiking trails in the Netherlands
Geography of Drenthe
Geography of Gelderland
Geography of Groningen (province)
Geography of Limburg (Netherlands)
Geography of Overijssel
South Limburg (Netherlands)